Lautens is a surname. Notable people with the surname include:

 Gary Lautens (1928–1992), Canadian humorist and newspaper columnist
 Mark Lautens (born 1959), Canadian organic chemist

See also
 Lauten